The Civic Union Party was a political party in Peru, founded in 1892 by Mariano Nicolás Valcárcel.

1892 establishments in Peru
Defunct political parties in Peru
Political parties established in 1892
Political parties with year of disestablishment missing